

The following lists events that happened during 1943 in Afghanistan.

The Treaty of Saadabad with Turkey, Iran, and Iraq is automatically renewed for a further five years, as none of its signatories has denounced it six months before expiration.

Incumbents
 Monarch – Mohammed Zahir Shah
 Prime Minister – Mohammad Hashim Khan

June 1, 1943
A new departure is taken by the appointment of the first Afghan minister to the U.S., Abdul Hossein Aziz, who formerly represented his country in Moscow.

October 24, 1943
It is learned that negotiations for a treaty of alliance between China and Afghanistan have been completed in Ankara.

References 

 
Afghanistan
Years of the 20th century in Afghanistan
Afghanistan
1940s in Afghanistan